The following is a list of schools in Western Province, Sri Lanka.

Colombo District

National schools

Provincial schools

Private schools

International Schools

Special Schools

Gampaha District

National schools

Provincial schools

Private Schools

International schools

Special Schools

Kalutara District

National schools

Provincial schools

Private schools

International schools

Special Schools

References

 
Western Province